Horatio Tertuliano Torromé, also credited as Henri Torromé (1861 – 16 September 1920), was a British figure skater who also competed for Argentina.

Torromé was born in Rio de Janeiro to an Argentine father and a Brazilian mother, and not long after his birth the family emigrated to London, England, this is where Torromé took up ice skating at his local club which was the Prince's Skating Club in Knightsbridge, London. Torromé competed at the 1902 World Figure Skating Championships in London and he finished in fourth place out of four starters, in 1905 and 1906 he came first at the British Figure Skating Championships.

Although Torromé qualified to represent Great Britain at the 1908 Summer Olympics, but he opted to compete for his fathers home country and so becoming the only representative for Argentina at the 1908 Summer Olympics held in London. He scored 228.9 points in the men's individual competition, placing last of the seven skaters who finished competition. Torromé also served as a judge for the pairs competition at the same Games, he would continue to be an active judge and was a part of the judging team for the 1912 World Figure Skating Championships.

From 1881 Horatio was a partner in his father's Commissioned Merchants business in Laurence Pountney Lane, Candlewick, London, his father retired in 1903 and left the business to be run by Horatio and his brother Franco, Horatio was also known for being an artist.

Horatio Torromé died on 16 September 1920 in Willesden, London.

References

Sources
 
 

1861 births
1920 deaths
Argentine figure skaters
British male single skaters
Olympic figure skaters of Argentina
Figure skaters at the 1908 Summer Olympics
Sportspeople from Rio de Janeiro (city)